Artyom Mikhailovich Shmykov (born 8 January 2002) is a Russian football player who plays as a centre-back for FC Irtysh Omsk on loan from FC Ural Yekaterinburg.

Club career
He made his debut in the Russian Football National League for FC Nizhny Novgorod on 30 August 2020 in a game against FC Tekstilshchik Ivanovo.

On 22 June 2021, he signed a long-term contract with Russian Premier League club FC Ural Yekaterinburg and assigned to the second squad in the third-tier FNL 2.

Career statistics

References

External links
 
 Profile by Russian Football National League
 

2002 births
People from Dzerzhinsk, Russia
Sportspeople from Nizhny Novgorod Oblast
Living people
Russian footballers
Association football defenders
FC Nizhny Novgorod (2015) players
FC Irtysh Omsk players
FC Ural Yekaterinburg players
FC Urozhay Krasnodar players
Russian First League players
Russian Second League players